Hallaton Castle was situated to the west of the village of Hallaton, which lies some 20 km to the south-east of the city of Leicester. It seems likely that the castle formed the administrative centre of an estate owned by Geoffrey Alselin, which is described in the Domesday Book, pinpointing the construction of the castle happening before 1086 but after 1066.

The earthworks only are present today.

References
Fry, Plantagenet Somerset, The David & Charles Book of Castles, Newton Abbot: David & Charles, 1980. 

Castles in Leicestershire